This is a list of publishers of academic journals by their submission policies regarding the use of preprints prior to publication (example list).

Publishers' policies on self-archiving (including of preprint versions) can also be found at SHERPA/RoMEO.

Policies by publisher
Submission of preprints is accepted by all open access journals. Over the last decade, they have been joined by most subscription journals, however publisher policies are often vague or ill-defined.

In general, most publishers that permit preprints require that:

 the authors disclose the existence of the preprint at submission (e.g. in the cover letter)
 once an article is published, the preprint should link to the published version (typically via DOI)
 the preprint should not have been formally peer reviewed

Publishers may place additional restrictions (e.g. specifying non-commercial servers or preferred licenses). Most publishers have a unified policy across all of their journals, however some journals list exceptions in their own policies.

See also
 Copyright policies of academic publishers
 Ingelfinger rule
 List of open-access journals
 List of preprint repositories

References

External links
 SHERPA/RoMEO - a list of publisher policies on copyright, preprints, and self-archiving

Preprint policy
Open access (publishing)